Hylaeus hyalinatus is a species of hymenopteran in the family Colletidae. It can be found in Europe, including Great Britain.  It is an invasive species in North America.

References

Further reading

External links

 

Colletidae
Articles created by Qbugbot
Insects described in 1842